Profilin-2 is a protein that in humans is encoded by the PFN2 gene.

The protein encoded by this gene is a ubiquitous actin monomer-binding protein belonging to the profilin family. It is thought to regulate actin polymerization in response to extracellular signals. There are two alternatively spliced transcript variants encoding different isoforms described for this gene.

Interactions
PFN2 has been shown to interact with ROCK1, Vasodilator-stimulated phosphoprotein, CCDC113 and FMNL1.

References

Further reading

External links